Reuben James Reid (born 26 July 1988) is an English professional footballer who plays for Southern Football League Premier South side Weston-super-Mare as a striker.

Born in Bristol, he has played in the Football League for Plymouth Argyle, Rochdale, Torquay United, Wycombe Wanderers, Brentford, Rotherham United, West Bromwich Albion, Peterborough United, Walsall, Oldham Athletic, Exeter City, Forest Green Rovers and Cheltenham Town.

Career

Plymouth Argyle
Reid was born in Bristol and attended Fairfield Grammar School. He joined Plymouth Argyle early in the 2005–06 season after attending trials with Manchester United and Crystal Palace. He soon impressed, playing for the youth team, with his quick feet, strong upper body, and regular goals. Reid gave up the chance of a professional cricket career with Gloucestershire, having played for their second XI, to pursue his career with Argyle and was rewarded with a professional contract in February 2006, along with fellow trainees Scott Laird and Chris Zebroski. He made his debut in the final game of the season against Ipswich Town. He signed a one-year contract the following close-season, with a further year's extension being agree in September 2006.

On 5 October 2006 he joined Kidderminster Harriers on a one-month loan and scored on his debut for them two days later. He was sent off in the final game of his loan spell, a 1–1 draw away to Exeter City and was recalled by Plymouth after being banned for three games. On returning to Plymouth, Reid played in both FA Cup 3rd round ties against Peterborough United, as well as making a couple of league substitute appearances, before going out on loan for the rest of the 2006–07 season to Rochdale on 25 January 2007. However, Rochdale ended his loan after a month, with Plymouth manager Ian Holloway reported as saying "They did not want him there any more. It is internal and I deal with it". Reid was suspended by Holloway for two weeks on his return to Plymouth.

On 22 March 2007, Reid joined Torquay United on loan until the end of the season. He made his debut as a second-half substitute for Ryan Dickson, also on loan from Plymouth, and scored a last minute winner as Torquay won 1–0 at home to Stockport County. He started the next game, scoring as Torquay lost 2–1 at home to Walsall.

Reid played in Argyle's first two League Cup games of the 2007–08 season, before being loaned to Wycombe Wanderers on 31 August 2007 for the remainder of the season. On 15 September 2007, Reid came on as a substitute to make his Wycombe debut against Macclesfield Town, and scored in the 89th minute. Wycombe ended his loan spell early. and Reid returned to Argyle in December only to be told by new Plymouth Argyle manager Paul Sturrock that he would be released at the end of the season. He joined Brentford on a three-month loan deal on 31 January 2008. He scored his first and only goal for the club in a 3–1 defeat at Darlington.

Rotherham United
He had a trial with Oxford United in June 2008, but signed for Rotherham United on 22 July 2008, after impressing on trial during the 2008–09 pre-season. He made an immediate impact to the squad, scoring the only goal as Rotherham won 1–0 at home to Lincoln City in the first game of the season. He became an instant hit with the Millers' faithful, scoring both the equaliser and winning penalty against local rivals Sheffield Wednesday in the League Cup. In the next round, Reid scored the winning penalty again, this time to knock out Championship leaders Wolverhampton Wanderers. Reid scored his first ever hat-trick in the Millers' 5–1 demolition of relegation threatened Chester City, it was the first time he'd scored more than one goal in a game, the following weekend he scored again in Rotherham's 2–1 over promotion chasing Rochdale, he also smashed a penalty against the bar. This goal took his tally to 13 for the season in all competitions. In the Millers next home game against local rivals Chesterfield, Reid bagged two goals including a superb lob in the Millers' 3–0 win. In the Millers next game, against Bury, he scored a penalty in a 1–1 draw. Reid then added another two goals to his overall tally, when he scored in the Millers' mid-week 4–2 win over doomed Luton Town, and an audacious 30-yard strike in the 1–0 win over Aldershot Town, to take him to 19 in all competitions.

West Bromwich Albion
In the summer of 2009, Reid looked set to move to work under Ian Holloway at Blackpool but instead signed for West Bromwich Albion for an undisclosed amount. He made his West Brom debut away at Bury in the 1st round of the League Cup on 11 August, but struggled to nail down a first team place consistently due to high competition on the forward line.

Peterborough United
Reid moved on loan to Peterborough United in January 2010 and was scheduled to remain there for three months, but was recalled by his parent club prior to the end of his 93 days. On 23 January 2010, Reid made his debut for Peterborough in a 2–1 loss against Sheffield Wednesday.

Walsall
Reid signed on loan for Walsall on 19 August 2010 until January 2011. Manager Chris Hutchings described Reid as "a young, hungry player with a proven track record [who] can play out wide or through the middle." He scored his first goal for Walsall on his debut against Plymouth Argyle on 21 August 2010, scoring the winning goal in the 70th minute of the 2–1 victory. Reid said he was grateful to Walsall for giving him the chance to play regularly.

Oldham Athletic
On 28 January 2011, Oldham Athletic signed Reid from West Bromwich Albion until the end of the season with an option to extend. He made his début the day after signing, coming on as a substitute against the 2–2 draw against Carlisle United, and made his first full start against Huddersfield Town on 12 February 2011 in a 0–0 draw at the Galpharm Stadium. His first goal for the club was the final goal scored against Hartlepool United in a 4–0 win on 1 February, and although he scored a second in a 2–0 win against Notts County, at the end of the season it was confirmed that the option to extend had not been taken up by the club.

On 20 May, however, Oldham announced that Reid had informed them he wanted to exercise an option to stay on reduced terms, and as such he had agreed a new deal for the 2011–12 season. He started the season well, scoring five goals before the end of September, but a thigh injury sustained in early October against Milton Keynes Dons kept him out of the reckoning till March. After that he was unable to re-establish himself as a regular, and scored just one goal, which came in a 3–2 defeat at Rochdale.

He was released by Oldham at the end of the 2011–12 season, along with eight other players.

Yeovil Town
Keen to move closer to his home in Bristol, Reid signed a two-year deal with League One side Yeovil Town, to take effect on 1 July 2012. Manager Gary Johnson commented favourably on the player's pace and power. On his move, Reid says moving to Yeovil could improve his form. He scored his first goal for Yeovil in a 4–0 win against Scunthorpe, and followed this by scoring twice against former club West Brom in a 4–2 defeat the next Tuesday.

Loan spells at Plymouth Argyle

Reid returned to Plymouth Argyle in January 2013 on loan for one month. It was extended for a second month in March after Reid made six appearances without scoring a goal. Reid scored his first goal for the club in a 2–0 win at Southend United, and at the end of the month the loan was extended until the end of the season.

In June 2013, it was confirmed Reid would rejoin Plymouth Argyle on loan until the end of the 2013–14 season.

Reid scored 21 goals for Plymouth in the 2013–14 season, being the first Plymouth striker to score 20+ goals in one season since Tommy Tynan in 1984. He also became the first Argyle player to score a hattrick since Vincent Péricard in 2006. He was awarded the Plymouth Argyle player of the season award on the last home game of the season.

Reid returned to Yeovil before being released at the end of the 2013–14 season, along with three other players.

Return to Plymouth Argyle
After several weeks of speculation, Reid signed a two-year contract with Plymouth Argyle in June 2014. He scored a hat-trick in the Derby match at Exeter City on 21 February 2015. He was offered a new contract at the end of the 2015–16 season but chose to move on.

Exeter City
Reid joined Exeter City on 13 September 2016. Reid scored his first goal for Exeter in a 4–1 win at Barnet on 15 October 2016.

Forest Green Rovers
On 5 January 2018, Reid signed for fellow League Two club Forest Green Rovers for an undisclosed fee on a two-and-a-half-year deal, scoring the only goal in a 1–0 victory over Port Vale a day later.

He was transfer listed by Forest Green Rovers at the end of the 2018–19 season.

Cheltenham Town
On 24 June 2019, it was announced that Reid had agreed to join local rivals Cheltenham Town on a free transfer.

Yeovil Town
On 5 January 2021, Reid re-joined National League side Yeovil Town until the end of the 2020–21 season. At the end of the 2021–22 season, Reid was released by Yeovil following the expiry of his contract.

Weston-super-Mare
In June 2022, Reid joined Southern Football League Premier South club Weston-super-Mare for the upcoming 2022–23 season.

Career statistics

Honours
Individual
PFA Team of the Year: 2014–15 League Two

References

External links

1988 births
Living people
People educated at Millfield
Association football forwards
Footballers from Bristol
English footballers
Kidderminster Harriers F.C. players
Plymouth Argyle F.C. players
Rochdale A.F.C. players
Torquay United F.C. players
Wycombe Wanderers F.C. players
Brentford F.C. players
Rotherham United F.C. players
West Bromwich Albion F.C. players
Peterborough United F.C. players
Walsall F.C. players
Oldham Athletic A.F.C. players
Yeovil Town F.C. players
Exeter City F.C. players
Forest Green Rovers F.C. players
Cheltenham Town F.C. players
Weston-super-Mare A.F.C. players
English Football League players
National League (English football) players